West Fork Cimarron River is an  tributary of the Cimarron River in Colorado. The river's source is west of Coxcomb Peak in the Uncompahgre Wilderness of Hinsdale County.  It joins the Cimarron River in Gunnison County.

Gallery

See also
List of rivers of Colorado
List of tributaries of the Colorado River

References

Rivers of Colorado
Rivers of Gunnison County, Colorado
Rivers of Hinsdale County, Colorado
Tributaries of the Colorado River in Colorado